Berkeley is a Metra commuter railroad station in Berkeley, Illinois, a western suburb of Chicago. Trains go east to Ogilvie Transportation Center in Chicago and as far west as Elburn, Illinois. Travel time to Ogilvie is 29 to 36 minutes, depending on the service. , Berkeley is the 173rd busiest of the 236 non-downtown stations in the Metra system, with an average of 145 weekday boardings. Unless otherwise announced, inbound trains use the north (island) platform and outbound trains use the south (side) platform.

As of December 5, 2022, Berkeley is served by 43 trains (21 inbound, 22 outbound) on weekdays, by all 10 trains in each direction on Saturdays, and by all nine trains in each direction on Sundays and holidays.

The station is at Park Avenue and Arthur Avenue. To the south there is a parking lot, a residential neighborhood of single-family homes, several distribution centers and warehouses. A large industrial estate that houses the Proviso Yard of Union Pacific Railroad sits to the north. Immediately to the west there are two highway overpasses that carry Interstate 294 and Interstate 290, respectively, over the freight yard. Berkeley Village Hall is on Electric Avenue, about a mile to the south.

References

External links
 

Metra stations in Illinois
Former Chicago and North Western Railway stations
Railway stations in Cook County, Illinois
Railway stations in the United States opened in 1953
Union Pacific West Line